This is a timeline documenting events and facts about English-speaking stand-up comedy in the year 2022.

January 
 January 20: Moses Storm's special Trash White on HBO Max.
 January 25: Aziz Ansari's special Nightclub Comedian on Netflix.
 January 27: River Butcher's special A Different Kind of Dude on HBO Max.

February 
 February 7: David Cross's special I'M FROM THE FUTURE.
 February 8: Ms. Pat's special Y'all Wanna Hear Something Crazy? on Netflix.
 February 10: Ian Lara's special Growing Shame on Comedy Central Stand-Up.
 February 14: Ali Wong's special Don Wong on Netflix.
 February 17: Mo Gilligan's special There's Mo to Life on Netflix.
 February 18: Eddie Izzard's special Wunderbar on Amazon Prime Video.
 February 24: Yedoye Travis's special Bury Me Loose on Comedy Central Stand-Up.
 February 28: Chappelle's Home Team - Earthquake's special Legendary on Netflix.

March 
 March 8: Taylor Tomlinson's special Look at You on Netflix.
 March 10: Ismael Loutfi's special Sound It Out on Comedy Central Stand-Up.
 March 15: Catherine Cohen's special The Twist …? She’s Gorgeous on Netflix.
 March 22: Jeff Foxworthy's special The Good Old Days on Netflix.
 March 24: Amy Miller's special Ham Mouth on Comedy Central Stand-Up.
 March 29: Mike Epps's special Indiana Mike on Netflix.

April 
 April 1: Jerrod Carmichael's special Rothaniel on HBO.
 April 5: Ronny Chieng's special Speakeasy on Netflix.
 April 7: Caleb Synan's special 30 on  Comedy Central Stand-Up.
 April 15: Bill Maher's special #Adulting on HBO Max.
 April 21: Marlon Wayans Presents: The Headliners on HBO Max.
 April 26: David Spade's special Nothing Personal on Netflix.
 April 28: Brendan Schaub's special The Gringo Papi on YouTube.
 April 30: Joe List's special This Year's Material on YouTube.

May 
 May 3: Chris DiStefano's special Speshy Weshy on Netflix.
 May 8: Christina P's special Mom Genes on Netflix.
 May 17: Katt Williams's special World War III on Netflix.
 May 19: The Hall: Honoring the Greats of Stand-Up on Netflix.
 May 19: Ali Siddiq's special The Domino Effect on Comedy Central Stand-Up.
 May 19: Yannis Pappas's special Mom Love on YanniLongDays.
 May 24: Ricky Gervais's special Supernature on Netflix.
 May 27: Fahim Anwar's special Hat Trick.
 May 30: Bo Burnham's special THE INSIDE OUTTAKES.
 May 30: Norm Macdonald's special Nothing Special on Netflix.

June 
 June 1: John Crist's special What Are We Doing on johnbcrist.
 June 6: Bill Burr Presents: Friends Who Kill on Netflix.
 June 6: Stavros Halkias's special Live At The Lodge Room on YouTube.
 June 9: Stand Out: An LGBTQ+ Celebration on Netflix.
 June 11: Amy Schumer's special Parental Advisory on Netflix.
 June 13: Pete Davidson Presents: The Best Friends on Netflix.
 June 14: Jane Fonda & Lily Tomlin: Ladies Night Live on Netflix.
 June 16: Snoop Dogg's special F*cn Around Comedy on Netflix.
 June 21: Joel Kim Booster's special Psychosexual on Netflix.
 June 23: Kyle Kinane's special Trampoline in a Ditch on YouTube. 
 June 23: Paul Virzi's special Nocturnal Admissions on Netflix.
 June 28: Cristela Alonzo's special Middle Classy on Netflix.

July 
 July 1: Jim Breuer's special Somebody Had to Say It on Breuer's Breuniverse.
 July 7: Dave Chappelle's special What’s in a Name? on Netflix.
 July 12: Bill Burr's special Live At Red Rocks on Netflix.
 July 16: Nikki Glaser's special Good Clean Filth on HBO Max. 
 July 17: Andrew Schulz's special Infamous on Moment House.
 July 18: Alonzo Bodden's special Stupid Don't Get Tired on Helium Comedy Studios. 
 July 19: David A. Arnold's special It Ain't for the Weak on Netflix.
 July 22: Josh Widdicombe's special Bit Much... on Channel 4 and All 4.
 July 26: Whitney Cummings's special Jokes on Netflix.

August 
 August 5: Jesus Sepulveda's special Mr. Tough Life on HBO Max.
 August 11: Bo Burnham's special The Inside Outtakes on Netflix.
 August 16: Tim Dillon's special A Real Hero on Netflix.
 August 31: Chris Redd's special The Half Hour on Comedy Central Stand-Up.

September 
 September 1: Sam Morril's special Same Time Tomorrow on Netflix.
 September 2: Jim Breuer's special Silly In San Diego on Breuer's Breuniverse.
 September 4: Stewart Lee's special Snowflake on BBC Two and BBC iPlayer.
 September 6: Sheng Wang's special Sweet and Juicy on Netflix.
 September 6: Rodrigo Marques's special King of Uncouth on Netflix.
 September 13: Jo Koy's special Live from the Los Angeles Forum on Netflix.
 September 14: Raanan Hershberg's special Jokes from the Underground on YouTube.
 September 20: Patton Oswalt's special We All Scream on Netflix.
 September 27: Nick Kroll's special Little Big Boy on Netflix.
 September 29: Stewart Lee's special Tornado on BBC Two and BBC iPlayer.

October 
 October 4: Hasan Minhaj's special The King's Jester on Netflix.
 October 5: Dane Cook's special Above It All on moment.com.
 October 8: Robert Kelly's special Kill Box on Louisck.com.
 October 11: Iliza Shlesinger's special Hot Forever on Netflix.
 October 13: Rachel Bradley's special Alpha Chick on Youtube.
 October 18: Gabriel Iglesias's special Stadium Fluffy Live From Los Angeles on Netflix.
 October 25: Fortune Feimster's special Good Fortune on Netflix.

November 
 November 2: Ari Shaffir's special JEW on YouTube.
 November 3: Chris Redd's special Why Am I Like This? on HBO Max.
 November 8: Neal Brennan's special Blocks on Netflix.
 November 12: Lil Rel Howery's special I Said It. Y'all Thinking It. on HBO
 November 15: Deon Cole's special Charleen's Boy on Netflix.
 November 22: Trevor Noah's special I Wish You Would on Netflix.
 November 25: Jeff Dunham's special Me the People on Comedy Central.
 November 29: Romesh Ranganathan's special The Cynic on Netflix.

December 
 December 6: Sebastian Maniscalco's special Is it Me? on Netflix.
 December 10: Atsuko Okatsuka's special The Intruder on HBO.
 December 13: Tom Papa's special What A Day! on Netflix.
 December 25: Vir Das's special Landing on Netflix.
 December 27: Chelsea Handler's special Revolution on Netflix.
 December 31: Best of Stand-Up 2022 on Netflix.

See also 
 List of stand-up comedians
 List of Netflix original stand-up comedy specials

References 

Stand-up comedy
Stand-up comedy
2020s in comedy
Stand-up comedy
Culture-related timelines by year